YGC may refer to:

Yale Glee Club, a collegiate choir in the U.S.
Young Greens of Canada, a political party youth wing
Ysbyty Glan Clwyd, a hospital in Wales, UK